The Bosniak Academy of Sciences and Arts is an academic institution in Bosnia and Herzegovina. The institution is based in Sarajevo (BiH) and has divisions in both Sarajevo and Novi Pazar (Serbia) to better reflect Bosniak interests in Bosnia and Herzegovina and Sandžak.

The institution was founded on 9 July 2011 in Novi Pazar under the initiative of Muamer ef. Zukorlić, mufti of the Islamic Community in Serbia. As per the decision of the founding assembly, Ferid Muhić was unilaterally proclaimed president while Dževad Jahić and Lamija Hadžiosmanović were named vice-presidents. The Grand Mufti of Bosnia, Dr. Mustafa ef. Cerić, was proclaimed President of the Senate.

Prominent members
Prof. Dr. Mustafa ef. Cerić, Grand Mufti (founder)
Muhamed Filipović, historian
Ferid Muhić, historian
Nedžad Ibrišimović, author
Šerbo Rastoder, politician
Ejup Ganić, politician

References

2011 establishments in Bosnia and Herzegovina
2011 establishments in Serbia
Scientific organizations established in 2011
National academies of sciences
National academies of arts and humanities
Education in Sarajevo
Culture in Sarajevo
Bosniak culture
Bosniak history
Novi Pazar